This is a list of stations used by long distance passenger trains, located in the German state and city of Hamburg. All stations are operated by DB Station&Service and serviced by trains of the Deutsche Bahn, the German national railway company.

Railway stations
There are several metro stations, operated by DB stations&service for the Hamburg S-Bahn and by the Hamburger Hochbahn for the Hamburg U-Bahn.
These stations are omitted here and listed in the list of Hamburg S-Bahn stations and list of Hamburg U-Bahn stations.

Notes
A.  German railway station categories assigned by the DB Station&Service, denoting the service level available at the station.
B.  Several codes are used to differentiate between various railway station types of Germany.

See also
Railway stations in Germany
List of Hamburg S-Bahn stations
List of Hamburg U-Bahn stations

References

External links
  

 

 
Railway stations
Hamb